Niobium diboride (NbB2) is a highly covalent refractory ceramic material with a hexagonal crystal structure.

Preparation 
NbB2 can be synthesized by stoichiometric reaction between constituent elements, in this case Nb and B. This reaction provides for precise stoichiometric control of the materials. Reduction of Nb2O5 (or NbO2) to niobium diboride can also be achieved via metallothermic reduction. Inexpensive precursor materials are used and reacted according to the reaction below:

Nb2O5 + 2 B2O3 + 11 Mg → 2 NbB2 + 11 MgO

Mg is used as a reactant in order to allow for acid leaching of unwanted oxide products. Stoichiometric excesses of Mg and B2O3 are often required during metallothermic reductions in order to consume all available niobium oxide.

Borothermal reduction of NbO2 with elemental boron via solid‐state reaction was proposed by Jha and coworker to obtain nanorods (40 × 800 nm2),

A variation of the borothermal reduction in molten salt was proposed by Ran and co‐worker using Nb2O5 with elemental boron to produce nanocrystals (61 nm).

Nanocrystals of NbB2 were successfully synthesized by Zoli's reaction, a reduction of Nb2O5 with NaBH4 using a molar ratio M:B of 1:4 at 700 °C for 30 min under argon flow.

Nb2O5 + 13/2 NaBH4 → 2 NbB2 + 4Na(g,l) + 5/2 NaBO2 + 13 H2(g)

Properties and use 
NbB2 is an ultra high temperature ceramic (UHTC) with a melting point of 3050 °C. This along with its relatively low density of ~6.97 g/cm3 and good high temperature strength makes it a candidate for high temperature aerospace applications such as hypersonic flight or rocket propulsion systems. It is an unusual ceramic, having relatively high thermal and electrical conductivities (Electrical resistivity of 25.7 µΩ⋅cm, CTE of 7.7⋅10−6 °C−1), properties it shares with isostructural titanium diboride, zirconium diboride, hafnium diboride and tantalum diboride.

NbB2 parts are usually hot pressed or spark plasma sintering (mechanical pressure applied to the heated powder) and then machined to shape. Sintering of NbB2 is hindered by the material's covalent nature and presence of surface oxides which increase grain coarsening before densification during sintering. Pressureless sintering of NbB2 is possible with sintering additives such as boron carbide and carbon which react with the surface oxides to increase the driving force for sintering but mechanical properties are degraded compared to hot pressed NbB2.

References 

Ceramic materials
Borides
Niobium(II) compounds